Mohammed Kabli is a Moroccan footballer. He usually plays midfielder and is a member of FAR Rabat.

Kabli has played for Moghreb Tétouan, whom he joined from AS Salé in August 2006. He won the 2008 Coupe du Trône with FAR Rabat.

He has been called into camp for the Morocco national football team.

References

External links
2009 statistics

1980 births
Living people
Footballers from Casablanca
Moroccan footballers
AS FAR (football) players
Moghreb Tétouan players
Association Salé players
Fath Union Sport players
Association football midfielders